Simpson-Breedlove House is a historic home located at Union Township, Boone County, Indiana.  It was built about 1865, and is a two-story, cubic, transitional Greek Revival / Italianate style brick farmhouse.  It has a low hipped roof with a flat deck on top.

It was listed on the National Register of Historic Places in 2016.

References

Houses on the National Register of Historic Places in Indiana
Greek Revival houses in Indiana
Italianate architecture in Indiana
Houses completed in 1865
Buildings and structures in Boone County, Indiana
National Register of Historic Places in Boone County, Indiana